Candaulism, or candaulesism, is a paraphilic sexual practice or fantasy in which one person exposes their partner, or images of their partner, to other people for their voyeuristic pleasure. Candaulism is also associated with voyeurism and exhibitionism.

The term may also be applied to the practice of undressing or otherwise exposing a female partner to others. Similarly, the term may also be applied to the posting of personal images of a female partner on the internet or urging her to wear clothing which reveals her physical attractiveness to others, such as wearing very brief clothing, such as a microskirt, tight-fitting or see-through clothing, or a low-cut top.

History of the term
The term is derived from an account in The Histories of Herodotus.  King Candaules of ancient Lydia, according to the story, conceived a plot to show his unaware naked wife to his servant Gyges. After discovering Gyges while he was watching her naked, Candaules' wife ordered him to choose between killing himself or killing her husband in order to repair the vicious mischief.

The term was first used in psychology by Richard von Krafft-Ebing in his 1886 book Psychopathia Sexualis.

Psychology
Isidor Sadger hypothesized that the candaulist completely identifies with his partner's body, and deep in his mind is showing himself. Candaulism is also associated with voyeurism and exhibitionism. An alternative definition proposes it as a practice involving one person observing, often from concealment, two others having sexual relations.

Historical instances
In the 1782 case of Sir Richard Worsley against George Bissett for "criminal conversation"—that is, adultery with Lady Worsley—it was revealed that Sir Richard assisted Bissett to spy on Lady Worsley taking a bath.

The art collector and connoisseur Charles Saatchi has considered the influence of candaulism upon the work of Salvador Dalí, citing episodes recorded by the artist's biographers in which Dalí's wife Gala was displayed to other men.

Robert Hanssen was an American FBI agent arrested in 2001 for spying for the Soviet Union and the Russian Federation. It was disclosed that he had taken explicit photographs of his wife and sent them to a friend. Later Hanssen invited his friend to clandestinely observe Hanssen having sex with Hanssen's wife during the friend's occasional visits to the Hanssen household. Initially, his friend watched through a window from outside the house. Later, Hanssen appropriated video equipment from the FBI to set up closed-circuit television to allow his friend to watch from his guest bedroom.

See also

Amateur pornography
Cuckold
Droit du seigneur
Erotic humiliation
Fan service
Il merlo maschio
Indecent exposure
Troilism

References

Bibliography

Further reading

 American Psychiatric Association, Diagnostic and Statistical Manual of Mental Disorders, Text Revision IV (DSM-IV-TR).
 Barbara Foster, Michael Foster, Letha Hadady. Three in Love: Ménages à trois from Ancient to Modern Times.  
 Geoffrey Chaucer, Canterbury Tales (the Miller's Tale is a story that humorously examines the life of a cuckold).
 A book by French Queen Maguerite de Valois
 Robertson Davies, Fifth Business
 David J. Ley, Insatiable Wives: Women Who Stray and the Men Who Love Them.  .

External links
 King Candaules as told by historian Herodotus. Archived from the original on 2020-01-02.
 

Group sex
History of human sexuality
Nudity
Paraphilias